As The Dark Wave Swells (2010) is the fifth and last album by Croatian surf-rock band The Bambi Molesters, who disbanded in 2018. The producer/string arranger was Chris Eckman, formerly of The Walkabouts who lived in Slovenia.

Track listing

Personnel
Dalibor Pavičić - guitar, baritone guitar
Dinko Tomljanović - acoustic guitar
 Lada Furlan Zaborac - bass, piano, organ
 Hrvoje Zaborac - drums

Sources
The Bambi Molesters - As the Dark Wave Swells

References

2010 albums
The Bambi Molesters albums